Seuga Frost (born 19 July 1966) is a former New Zealand rugby union player. She played for the Black Ferns and Canterbury. She made her debut for New Zealand at RugbyFest 1990 against the Netherlands on 26 August 1990 at Ashburton. She was selected for the 1991 Women's Rugby World Cup squad, but did not get to play at the World Cup.

References 

1966 births
Living people
New Zealand female rugby union players
New Zealand women's international rugby union players